Denis Aloysius "Alan" O'Donognue (3 June 1891 – 10 February 1959) was an Australian rules footballer who played for Richmond and South Melbourne in the VFL.

O'Donognue was both a follower and key position player.  He started his career at Richmond but only managed the one season and in 1914 made his debut for South Melbourne.  In that year's Grand Final he played as a centre half forward in their losing side.  He was a member of South Melbourne's 1918 premiership team though, in what would be his last game of league football he was a centre half back in their five-point win over Collingwood.

References

External links
 

1891 births
Australian rules footballers from Victoria (Australia)
Sydney Swans players
Sydney Swans Premiership players
Richmond Football Club players
Leopold Football Club (MJFA) players
1959 deaths
One-time VFL/AFL Premiership players